The Smith Avenue High Bridge or the High Bridge is an inverted arch bridge that carries Minnesota State Highway 149 and Smith Avenue over the Mississippi River in Saint Paul, Minnesota, United States. It was built and opened in 1987 at a cost of $20 million.

The current bridge replaced a  iron Warren deck truss bridge constructed in 1889. In 1904 the original bridge was partially destroyed by a tornado or severe storm and the southernmost five spans had to be rebuilt. With modest alterations it served for nearly a century, but in 1977 an inspection found irreparable structural deficiencies. The Minnesota Department of Transportation enacted a weight restriction on the bridge until it was closed in 1984 and demolished in 1985. The ornamental ironwork on the replacement was built using iron from the old bridge. The first bridge had been listed on the National Register of Historic Places in 1981 and was delisted in 1988.

In February 2008, City Pages, a weekly publication in the Twin Cities, published a feature about the long history of suicide at the bridge. The article included testimony of a survivor who leapt from the bridge.

The bridge closed September 2017 for a redecking project. It reopened to traffic the afternoon of November 21, 2018.

Gallery

See also
List of bridges documented by the Historic American Engineering Record in Minnesota
List of crossings of the Upper Mississippi River

References

External links

 of the previous bridge

1987 establishments in Minnesota
Bridges completed in 1895
Bridges completed in 1987
Bridges in Saint Paul, Minnesota
Bridges over the Mississippi River
Former National Register of Historic Places in Minnesota
Historic American Engineering Record in Minnesota
Open-spandrel deck arch bridges in the United States
National Register of Historic Places in Saint Paul, Minnesota
Plate girder bridges in the United States
Road bridges on the National Register of Historic Places in Minnesota